Bluggoe, Orinoco, Musa Orinoco, or burro is a cultivar of banana.

Genome
Bluggoe is a triploid ABB cultivar.

Cultivation
Bluggoe is a cold hardy banana, growing in USDA zones 810 or 710.

Tree
Width of leaves same dimensions.

Flowers
Pink to cream coloured.

Fruit
It is primarily a cooking banana but can be eaten as a dessert banana.

References

Banana cultivars